Samuel Lawrie (15 December 1934 – 26 August 1979) was a Scottish professional footballer who played as a right winger. Lawrie made over 300 appearances in the Football League between 1952 and 1966.

Career
Born in Glasgow, Lawrie played with Bedlay Juniors, Middlesbrough, Charlton Athletic, Montreal Concordia and Bradford Park Avenue.

Death
Lawrie died on 26 August 1979, at the age of 44.

References

1934 births
1979 deaths
Scottish footballers
Middlesbrough F.C. players
Charlton Athletic F.C. players
Montreal Concordia players
Bradford (Park Avenue) A.F.C. players
English Football League players
Association football wingers
Scottish expatriate footballers
Scottish expatriates in Canada
Expatriate soccer players in Canada